Yngve Leidulv Sætre (born 13 May 1962 in Ørsta, Norway) is a Norwegian record producer, musician (vocals and keyboards). He worked as a record producer in Sigma Studio, before, together with Jørgen Træen, he started Duper Studio in Møhlenpris, Bergen in 1996.

Career 
Sætre has produced albums for several well-known Norwegian artists and bands, like DumDum Boys (five albums), Anne Grete Preus (Alfabet), Kaizers Orchestra, Kjetil Grande (Uppers, Downers, Screamers & Howlers), Ephemera (Sun), Vidar Vang (Stand Up Straight), "Trang Fødsel" (Hybel and Damp), Christine Sandtorv (First last dance), og 3 album for John Olav Nilsen & Gjengen.

He is also known as the lead singer of the Norwegian band Barbie Bones (1987–1993) from Bergen. They received the Spellemannprisen 1992 award in the category Pop band, for the album Death in the Rockinghorse Factory. He has in recent years been the keyboardist in the bands Popium and Tweeterfriendly Music. Sætre was awarded producer price during Spellemannprisen 2009.

Honors 
1992: Spellemannprisen in the category Pop band, for the album Death in the Rockinghorse Factory, within the band Barbie Bones
2009: Spellemannprisen in the category Producer

Discography (in selection) 

Within Secret Mission
1986: Watch The Night (Famous Records)
1986: ........To Be Continued (Famous Records)

With deLillos
1987: Før Var Det Morsomt Med Sne (Sonet Grammofon), ("Hun Har Gått Seg Vill")

Within Forbidden Colours
1989: Words to the World & Songs for the Girl (Colour Records)

Within Barbie Bones
1990: Brake For Nobody (EMI Records)
1992: Death in the Rockinghorse Factory (EMI Records)

With Pogo Pops
1992: Pop Trip (Norsk Plateproduksjon)
1993: Crash (Norsk Plateproduksjon)
1995: Pure (Norsk Plateproduksjon)
2009: Darling Emm, Northern girl (VME)

With Butterfly Garden
1996: For You (Service Records), including with Kjartan Kristiansen

With Ephemera
2000: Sun (Ephemera Records)
2004: Monolove (Ephemera Records)

Within Tweeterfriendly Music
2000: Vol. 1 Maxi Single (Warner Music Norway)
2001: Enjoy Tweeterfriendly Music Vol. 2 (Warner Music Norway)
2003: Gin & Phonic ***3-03  (Warner Music Norway)

With Sondre Lerche
2001: Faces Down (Virgin Records)

With Ralph Myerz & The Jack Herren Band
2001: A Special Album (Emperor Norton)
2004: Your New Best Friends (Emperor Norton)

With Sister Sonny
2001: The Bandit Lab (Rec90)

With Morten Abel
2003: Being Everything, Knowing Nothing (Virgin Records)

With Christine Sandtorv
2006: First Last Dance (Ifemmera Records)

With Toy
2007: Half Baked Alaska (Smalltown Supersound)

With John Olav Nilsen & Gjengen
2009: For Sant Til Å Være Godt (Voices of Wonder Records)
2012: Den Eneste Veien Ut (Virgin Records)

With Maria Due
2010: Kissing in Public (Trust Me Records)

With Fjorden Baby!
2011: Se Deg Rundt I Rommet (Fjorden Biznizz)

With Razika
2011: På Vei Hjem (K. Dahl Eftf.)

References

External links 
Yngve Leidulv Sætre on MUSIKKguiden.no

Norwegian record producers
Norwegian male singers
Norwegian keyboardists
Spellemannprisen winners
People from Ørsta
1962 births
Living people
Musicians from Møre og Romsdal